The influenza A virus subtype H1N1 (initially known as swine influenza virus or as new flu, and also locally known as gripe A, gripe porcina, and influenza porcina) arrived in Argentina in late April 2009, through air traffic contact with endemic areas, especially Mexico and the United States.

The World Health Organization (WHO) and the Argentine health authorities expressed their concern from the beginning of the outbreak, that the imminent arrival of the southern winter could cause "more serious" effects in the southern hemisphere than those caused in Mexico, and could lead to a rebound of the epidemic around the world. The flu or influenza is mainly a seasonal disease that becomes most prevalent in winter.

The first infection was confirmed on May 7 in a man who had come from Mexico City and had entered the country without symptoms on April 24. The second case was detected on May 22. Towards the end of May infection started in some schools in the northern community of the City of Buenos Aires and its suburbs, the main part of the country affected by the epidemic.

On June 15 the first death was announced: a three-month-old baby in the Greater Buenos Aires area. In the second half of June, coinciding with the onset of winter, the virus was widely transmitted in Buenos Aires and spread to other parts of the country, especially the Province of Santa Fe, with its center in the city of Rosario.

On June 29, the Government decided to close schools throughout the month of July, a measure which affected 11 million students. Pregnant women and other categories at risk were also dispensed from working. The measures taken by the authorities were primarily targeted to limit contagion during the winter months until the start of spring.

The peak of infection lasted from the end of June until the beginning of July, increasing normal hospital demand fivefold and causing the collapse of the systems organizing hospital wards, home doctors and work place doctors. The most affected area was Greater Buenos Aires, home to some 12 million people. It was estimated that up to 10% of the population of that region (approximately 1,200,000 people) could be affected by the pandemic of influenza A.

In Argentina, seasonal flu outbreaks kill about 4,000 people each year, equivalent to a rate of 10 deaths per 100,000 inhabitants. The contingency plan developed in 2006 to face a possible influenza pandemic estimated that the dead could reach 13,000 in the event of a moderate rate of infection (15%) and 30,000 in the event of a serious infection rate (35%).

Timeline

April
April 26:
The Ministry of Health issued an Epidemic Alert order asking airlines to report passengers with influenza symptoms arriving from Mexico and United States. The government also stepped up safety checks, and thermal scanners were used in airports to detect passengers running fevers.

April 28:
The Argentine government suspended all flights originating in Mexico until May 15 as a precautionary measure.
The first flight coming from Mexico arrived at Ezeiza International Airport on May 20.

May
May 1:
The Argentine government sent charter flights to Mexico to pick up all Argentine tourists abroad who wished to return.

May 7:
The first case of Influenza A (H1N1) was confirmed in the country, a tourist who had recently returned from Mexico. This man was from Puerto Madryn, Chubut Province.

May 22:
Health Authorities confirmed the second case, a woman who had arrived from the United States about 20 days before.

June

June 25:
A case of human-to-swine transmission was discovered in Buenos Aires province. The hog farm where it occurred was interdicted. This was the second known case of reverse-zoonosis in the world.

June 28:
Due to the ongoing legislative elections and the possible resignation of the Health Minister, Graciela Ocaña, reports of confirmed cases and deaths were suspended.

June 29:
Argentina's Health Minister, Graciela Ocaña, announced her resignation due to some political instability in the country and stated that the current government did not support her on some projects and plans she recommended for the betterment of the country. The Provinces of Santa Fe (after confirming the first two deaths), San Luis (with 5 confirmed cases and more than 30 suspected cases) and Santiago del Estero (which on the same day confirmed 12 cases of swine flu) each decided to suspend all classes of elementary, primary and secondary schools, and recommended that the universities adopt the same procedure.

June 30:
The government of the Autonomous City of Buenos Aires alongside the government of the Buenos Aires province, decreed a Health Emergency, though public services continued their operations. Winter holidays for students had started two weeks before.

July
July 2:
The newly appointed Health Minister Juan Luis Manzur estimated the number of affected people to be as high as 100,000, as well as 44 confirmed deaths.

July 14:
The number of officially recognised cases skyrocketed, with 137 deaths, making the death toll in Argentina the second highest in the world, only behind the United States and surpassing confirmed cases in Mexico.

July 28:
Impact on health services diminished significantly according to various specialists, though the death toll continued to increase, partly because of the delay in confirming previous fatalities. There had been no official report by the national Health Ministry since July 14.

July 30:
Official reports of confirmed deaths from the provinces put the death toll around 260, while Critica newspaper published an interview with Jorge Yabkowski, president of the Sindical Federation of Health Professionals of Argentina (Fesprosa), giving an estimate death toll from H1N1 flu of above 400 (while USA was at 340), based on the false death count in Buenos Aires, where many patients may have "entered the hospitals almost dead and were not tested for H1N1".

August
August 3:
The students returned to schools in all except 3 provinces, while awaiting a possible second wave. The estimated cumulative number of H1N1 cases was more than 400,000 Argentinians.

August 5:
A new report was released by the ministry of health, showing 762,711 ILI cases up to Aug 1, 2009, of which more than 700,000 were of the A (H1N1) swine flu type. Only 47% of the 337 confirmed H1N1 flu deaths had a history of chronic disease or any other risk factor. Additionally, 402 deaths were in the process of being confirmed, whereas the number of cases began to decrease in 18 of the 24 provinces.

August 14: Further decrease in activity levels. Official death count: 404.

August 24:
Indicators showed a decreasing activity tendency, while intensity was still high. The impact on health services returned to low, and most provinces had no recent deaths. The official death count was 439.

August 29:
Week 32 saw no further decrease in new ILI cases, reaching 818,031 cumulative cases. Confirmed deaths: 465, deaths under study: 349.

September
September 7:
ILI cases reported up to week 33: 1,054,707. Cumulative data up to week 32: 8,384 H1N1 lab-confirmed cases, 512 deaths (+196 under study), respiratory disease cases requiring hospitalization: 8,962.

September 12:
Week 35 national report stated that up to week 34 there were 8,851 (+467) total lab-confirmed cases, with 514 (+2) confirmed deaths among them and 196 (+0) additional deaths under study (no provinces specified). The cumulative respiratory disease cases requiring hospitalization were 9,480 (+518), and the cumulative ILI cases reported were 1,060,285 (+5,578).

September 26:
There was no official report for week 36. Week 37 national report: 9,036 (+185) total lab-confirmed cases; 538 (+24) confirmed deaths; 252 (+56) additional deaths under study. Cumulative respiratory disease cases requiring hospitalization: 10,306 (+826); cumulative ILI cases reported: 1,098,834 (+38,549).

October
October 2: Week 38 national report: 9,049 (+13) total lab-confirmed cases; 539 (+1) confirmed deaths; 254 (+2) additional deaths under study. Cumulative respiratory disease cases requiring hospitalization: 10,773 (+467); cumulative ILI cases reported: 1,151,655 (+52,821).

October 10: Week 39 national report: 9,119 (+70) total lab-confirmed cases; 580 (+41) confirmed deaths; 247 (−7) additional deaths under study. Notably, the date of decease of last confirmed death is August 20. Cumulative respiratory disease cases requiring hospitalization: 11,086 (+313); cumulative ILI cases reported: 1,163,433 (+11,778).

October 24: Week 40 national report: 9,196 (+77) total lab-confirmed cases; 585 (+5) confirmed deaths; 247 (+0) additional deaths under study. Last confirmed death: September 5. Cumulative respiratory disease cases requiring hospitalization: 11,689 (+603); cumulative ILI cases reported: 1,187,540 (+24,107).

November
November 1: Week 42 national report: 10,209 (+1,013) total lab-confirmed cases; 593 (+8) confirmed deaths; 248 (+1) additional deaths under study. Last confirmed death: September 12. Cumulative respiratory disease cases requiring hospitalization: 12,139 (+450); cumulative ILI cases reported: 1,219,949 (+32,409).

Timeline Summary

Confirmed cases and deaths by province

Confirmed cases and deaths by date

References

External links

 Ministry of Health of the Argentine Nation
 Pan-American Health Organization, Argentina
 Swine flu – World Health Organization

Flu pandemic
Argentina
Health in Argentina